Ostrvo tuge (The Island of Sorrow) is the sixth studio album by Bosnian pop-folk singer Selma Bajrami. It was released through Grand Production in 2007.

Background
Bajrami began recording her sixth album as early as June 2006 with producer Aleksandar 'Futa' Radulović, but later switched producers and teamed with Dejan Abadić.

Track listing

Personnel
Bane Kljajić – acoustic guitar, bouzouki 
Dragutin Jakovljević Guta – electric guitar
Dejan Kostić Piromanac – violin

Biljana Obradović Bixy - Back vocals

Production and recording
Dejan Abadić – arrangement, producing
Goran Šimpraga – mastering
Đorđe Petrović – programming, recording

Music videos
In December 2006, she filmed the music for the song "Ostrvo tuge" in Skopje, Macedonia.

Promjeni se
Kad se ne da, ne da se
Ostrvo tuge

Tour
Following the release of The Island of Sorrow, Selma went on an American tour, performing for the Bosnian diaspora in the United States.

References

2007 albums
Selma Bajrami albums
Grand Production albums